The Irish Connection may refer to

Albums
 The Irish Connection (Johnny Logan album) (2007) 
 The Irish Connection 2, the second Irish Connection album by Johnny Logan (2013)
 The Irish Connection (Brian McFadden album) (2013)

See also
 List of Ireland-related topics